is a Japanese acoustic guitar duo formed in 1978 by  and . Gontiti's music incorporates a number of styles, including bossa nova, flamenco, and classical music.

Recordings
As of 2007 Gontiti have recorded more than thirty original albums and compilations. Most of their recordings have been for Epic/Sony Records. The duo have also provided music for a number of Japanese films, most notably the 2004 Hirokazu Kore-eda film Dare mo shiranai, released in English-speaking countries as Nobody Knows.

Discography

External links

 
ディスコグラフィ | Sony Music - Discography in Epic/Sony Records website 
Album01 of GONTITI - Discography in official website 
Gontiti Fan's Web Site 
[ Gontiti] at Allmusic.
Titi Matsumura and Gonzalez Mikami at Internet Movie Database.

References

Musical groups established in 1978
Japanese rock music groups
World music groups